The Waco Model W Aristocraft was an American four-seat monoplane, the last aircraft designed and built by the Waco Aircraft Company. It had an unusual configuration with an engine mounted at the front driving a pusher propeller at the rear.

Design and development
The Aristocraft was an attempt by Waco to enter the post-war market for light aircraft. The prototype first flew in March 1947 powered by a  Franklin 6AL piston engine mounted at the front with a shaft driven pusher propeller at the rear. Of all-metal construction it was a high-wing monoplane with twin fins and rudders, It had a partially retractable tricycle landing gear.

The company had orders for 300 aircraft but decided that the type would need costly development in a shrinking market and only the prototype was completed. Waco sold the design rights and in the 1960s efforts were made to market the type for home-construction.

The sole prototype was eventually purchased in the early 1960s and restored to flight.

Specifications

See also

References

Notes

Bibliography

1940s United States civil utility aircraft
Aristocraft
Single-engined pusher aircraft
Mid-engined aircraft
Aircraft first flown in 1947